The 1991–92 NBA season was the 24th season for the Seattle SuperSonics in the National Basketball Association. After a 7–3 start to the season, head coach K. C. Jones was fired with the team holding an 18–18 record. After splitting four games under interim coach Bob Kloppenburg, the Sonics hired George Karl, who returned after a four-year absence from coaching in the NBA. Under Karl, the SuperSonics held a 24–24 record at the All-Star break, and finished the season fourth in the Pacific Division with a 47–35 record, reaching the playoffs as the number 6 seed in the Western Conference.

Ricky Pierce led the team in scoring averaging 21.7 points per game, while sixth man Eddie Johnson averaged 17.1 points per game off the bench, and Shawn Kemp played most of the season off the bench averaging 15.5 points, 10.4 rebounds and 1.9 blocks per game. In addition, Derrick McKey provided the team with 14.9 points and 5.2 rebounds per game, but only played 52 games due to a thumb injury, while Benoit Benjamin provided with 14.0 points, 8.1 rebounds and 1.9 blocks per game, only playing 63 games due to a broken hand, second-year guard Gary Payton contributed 9.4 points, 6.2 assists and 1.8 steals per game, and Michael Cage averaged 8.8 points and 8.9 rebounds per game.

In the Western Conference First Round of the playoffs, the SuperSonics defeated the 3rd-seeded Golden State Warriors in four games, winning the final two games by just four points. However, they lost in the Western Conference Semi-finals to the Utah Jazz in five games.

Draft picks

Roster

Regular season

Season standings

y – clinched division title
x – clinched playoff spot

z – clinched division title
y – clinched division title
x – clinched playoff spot

Record vs. opponents

Game log

|- align="center" bgcolor="#ffcccc"
| 1
| November 1
| Phoenix Suns
| L 95-99
| R. Pierce (25)
| M. Cage (13)
| G. Payton (7)
| Seattle Center Coliseum12,863
| 0-1

|- align="center" bgcolor="#ffcccc"
| 2
| November 3
| San Antonio Spurs
| L 98-106
| D. McKey (23)
| M. Cage (9)
| N. McMillan (10)
| Seattle Center Coliseum12,863
| 0-2

|- align="center" bgcolor="#ccffcc"
| 3
| November 5
| Sacramento Kings
| W 98-87
| D. McKey (20)
| M. Cage (16)
| G. Payton (9)
| Seattle Center Coliseum9,343
| 1-2

|- align="center" bgcolor="#ccffcc"
| 4
| November 7
| @ Utah Jazz
| W 103-95
| B. Benjamin (22)
| B. Benjamin (13)
| G. Payton (5)
| Delta Center18,700
| 2-2

|- align="center" bgcolor="#ccffcc"
| 5
| November 9
| Indiana Pacers
| W 118-111
| M. Cage (23)
| M. Cage (22)
| G. Payton (7)
| Seattle Center Coliseum11,930
| 3–2

|- align="center" bgcolor="#ffcccc"
| 6
| November 14
| @ Cleveland Cavaliers
| L 109-115 (OT)
| R. Pierce (29)
| M. Cage (10)
| G. Payton (12)
| Coliseum at Richfield10,838
| 3–3

|- align="center" bgcolor="#ccffcc"
| 7
| November 15
| @ Indiana Pacers
| W 124-108
| R. Pierce (34)
| M. Cage (14)
| G. Payton (15)
| Market Square Arena10,877
| 4–3

|- align="center" bgcolor="#ccffcc"
| 8
| November 17
| @ Minnesota Timberwolves
| W 101-91
| R. Pierce (28)
| M. Cage (11)
| G. Payton (9)
| Target Center19,006
| 5–3

|- align="center" bgcolor="#ccffcc"
| 9
| November 19
| @ Washington Bullets
| W 113-106
| G. Payton (22)
| M. Cage (20)
| G. Payton (7)
| Capital Centre7,015
| 6–3

|- align="center" bgcolor="#ccffcc"
| 10
| November 20
| @ Detroit Pistons
| W 91-86
| R. Pierce (18)
| M. Cage (9)
| N. McMillan,G. Payton (4)
| The Palace of Auburn Hills21,454
| 7-3

|- align="center" bgcolor="#ffcccc"
| 11
| November 22
| Chicago Bulls
| L 109-112 (OT)
| R. Pierce (30)
| B. Benjamin,M. Cage (12)
| G. Payton (7)
| Kingdome38,067
| 7–4

|- align="center" bgcolor="#ffcccc"
| 12
| November 24
| @ Los Angeles Clippers
| L 86-89
| R. Pierce (28)
| B. Benjamin (15)
| B. Benjamin,N. McMillan (5)
| Los Angeles Memorial Sports Arena9,196
| 7-5

|- align="center" bgcolor="#ccffcc"
| 13
| November 26
| Golden State Warriors
| W 136-130 (OT)
| E. Johnson (29)
| D. McKey (15)
| N. McMillan (9)
| Seattle Center Coliseum11,743
| 8-5

|- align="center" bgcolor="#ffcccc"
| 14
| November 29
| @ Denver Nuggets
| L 90-101
| E. Johnson (20)
| M. Cage (13)
| G. Payton (4)
| McNichols Sports Arena10,613
| 8-6

|- align="center" bgcolor="#ffcccc"
| 15
| November 30
| @ San Antonio Spurs
| L 101-119
| E. Johnson (21)
| N. McMillan (10)
| G. Payton (5)
| HemisFair Arena16,057
| 8-7

|- align="center" bgcolor="#ccffcc"
| 16
| December 3
| Washington Bullets
| W 91-90
| R. Pierce (26)
| S. Kemp (12)
| G. Payton (5)
| Seattle Center Coliseum 10,957
| 9-7

|- align="center" bgcolor="#ccffcc"
| 17
| December 6
| Minnesota Timberwolves
| W 96-94
| R. Pierce (29)
| M. Cage (23)
| G. Payton,R. Pierce (5)
| Seattle Center Coliseum9,796
| 10-7

|- align="center" bgcolor="#ccffcc"
| 18
| December 7
| Dallas Mavericks
| W 104-101
| R. Pierce (27)
| M. Cage (14)
| N. McMillan (6)
| Seattle Center Coliseum12,313
| 11-7

|- align="center" bgcolor="#ffcccc"
| 19
| December 10
| @ Chicago Bulls
| L 103-108
| R. Pierce (30)
| M. Cage (13)
| S. Kemp,G. Payton (5)
| Chicago Stadium18,061
| 11-8

|- align="center" bgcolor="#ffcccc"
| 20
| December 11
| @ New York Knicks
| L 87-96
| R. Pierce (25)
| B. Benjamin,S. Kemp (9)
| R. Pierce (7)
| Madison Square Garden14,934
| 11-9

|- align="center" bgcolor="#ffcccc"
| 21
| December 13
| @ Boston Celtics
| L 97-117
| R. Pierce (21)
| B. Benjamin (8)
| N. McMillan (8)
| Boston Garden14,890
| 11-10

|- align="center" bgcolor="#ffcccc"
| 22
| December 14
| @ Philadelphia 76ers
| L 95-104
| B. Benjamin (23)
| B. Benjamin (9)
| N. McMillan (8)
| The Spectrum12,395
| 11-11

|- align="center" bgcolor="#ccffcc"
| 23
| December 17
| Los Angeles Clippers
| W 116-99
| B. Benjamin (20)
| M. Cage (13)
| N. McMillan (6)
| Seattle Center Coliseum10,357
| 12-11

|- align="center" bgcolor="#ccffcc"
| 24
| December 19
| Denver Nuggets
| W 119-106
| R. Pierce (29)
| M. Cage (15)
| D. McKey,N. McMillan,G. Payton (4)
| Seattle Center Coliseum10,663
| 13-11

|- align="center" bgcolor="#ccffcc"
| 25
| December 21
| Golden State Warriors
| W 120-112
| R. Pierce (34)
| G. Payton (11)
| G. Payton (12)
| Seattle Center Coliseum14,180
| 14-11

|- align="center" bgcolor="#ffcccc"
| 26
| December 22
| @ Portland Trail Blazers
| L 87-96
| B. Benjamin (18)
| M. Cage (9)
| B. Kofoed,G. Payton (5)
| Memorial Coliseum12,888
| 14-12

|- align="center" bgcolor="#ccffcc"
| 27
| December 26
| @ Sacramento Kings
| W 115-106 (OT)
| R. Pierce (27)
| B. Benjamin (13)
| G. Payton (5)
| ARCO Arena17,014
| 15-12

|- align="center" bgcolor="#ffcccc"
| 28
| December 27
| Boston Celtics
| L 87-110
| R. Pierce (26)
| D. McKey (7)
| G. Payton (4)
| Kingdome37,175
| 15-13

|- align="center" bgcolor="#ccffcc"
| 29
| January 2
| Miami Heat
| W 113-109 (OT)
| R. Pierce (34)
| B. Benjamin (15)
| N. McMillan,G. Payton (4)
| Seattle Center Coliseum10,787
| 16-13

|- align="center" bgcolor="#ffcccc"
| 30
| January 4
| Philadelphia 76ers
| L 93-112
| D. McKey (24)
| M. Cage,S. Kemp (7)
| G. Payton (7)
| Seattle Center Coliseum14,166
| 16-14

|- align="center" bgcolor="#ccffcc"
| 31
| January 7
| @ Denver Nuggets
| W 106-99
| R. Pierce (28)
| S. Kemp (11)
| G. Payton (4)
| McNichols Sports Arena8,877
| 17-14

|- align="center" bgcolor="#ffcccc"
| 32
| January 8
| Orlando Magic
| L 103-104
| B. Benjamin (24)
| S. Kemp (8)
| G. Payton (9)
| Seattle Center Coliseum9,958
| 17-15

|- align="center" bgcolor="#ccffcc"
| 33
| January 10
| @ Dallas Mavericks
| W 94-82
| E. Johnson (19)
| S. Kemp (13)
| G. Payton (9)
| Reunion Arena
| 18-15

|- align="center" bgcolor="#ffcccc"
| 34
| January 11
| @ Houston Rockets
| L 115-119
| E. Johnson (28)
| B. Benjamin,M. Cage (7)
| N. McMillan (8)
| The Summit15,458
| 18-16

|- align="center" bgcolor="#ffcccc"
| 35
| January 13
| @ Los Angeles Clippers
| L 94-98
| E. Johnson (20)
| B. Benjamin,E. Johnson,S. Kemp (10)
| G. Payton (8)
| Los Angeles Memorial Sports Arena10,087
| 18-17

|- align="center" bgcolor="#ffcccc"
| 36
| January 14
| Charlotte Hornets
| L 116-117 (OT)
| R. Pierce (20)
| S. Kemp (12)
| B. Kofoed (9)
| Seattle Center Coliseum9,132
| 18-18

|- align="center" bgcolor="#ccffcc"
| 37
| January 16
| Los Angeles Clippers
| W 101-98
| R. Pierce (26)
| S. Kemp (19)
| G. Payton (6)
| Seattle Center Coliseum10,408
| 19-18

|- align="center" bgcolor="#ccffcc"
| 38
| January 18
| Los Angeles Lakers
| W 112-108
| R. Pierce (28)
| M. Cage (10)
| B. Benjamin (4)
| Seattle Center Coliseum14,533
| 20-18

|- align="center" bgcolor="#ffcccc"
| 39
| January 20
| @ Los Angeles Lakers
| L 110-116
| E. Johnson (29)
| S. Kemp (15)
| G. Payton (6)
| Great Western Forum17,236
| 20-19

|- align="center" bgcolor="#ffcccc"
| 40
| January 21
| Atlanta Hawks
| L 119-128
| R. Pierce (29)
| S. Kemp (13)
| G. Payton (10)
| Seattle Center Coliseum11,436
| 20-20

|- align="center" bgcolor="#ffcccc"
| 41
| January 23
| Portland Trail Blazers
| L 109-113
| S. Kemp (26)
| E. Johnson,S. Kemp (9)
| R. Pierce (8)
| Seattle Center Coliseum14,457
| 20-21

|- align="center" bgcolor="#ffcccc"
| 42
| January 25
| Utah Jazz
| L 103-104
| B. Benjamin,R. Pierce (22)
| S. Kemp (12)
| G. Payton (8)
| Seattle Center Coliseum14,084
| 20-22

|- align="center" bgcolor="#ccffcc"
| 43
| January 28
| @ Orlando Magic
| W 102-97
| E. Johnson (39)
| E. Johnson (11)
| G. Payton (7)
| Orlando Arena15,151
| 21-22

|- align="center" bgcolor="#ffcccc"
| 44
| January 29
| @ Miami Heat
| L 114-119
| R. Pierce (28)
| S. Kemp (16)
| G. Payton (11)
| Miami Arena14,728
| 21-23

|- align="center" bgcolor="#ccffcc"
| 45
| January 31
| @ Charlotte Hornets
| W 122-105
| E. Johnson (30)
| S. Kemp (21)
| N. McMillan (8)
| Charlotte Coliseum23,698
| 22-23

|- align="center" bgcolor="#ffcccc"
| 46
| February 2
| @ Milwaukee Bucks
| L 106-122
| B. Benjamin (19)
| B. Benjamin (13)
| T. Brown (4)
| Bradley Center17,832
| 22-24

|- align="center" bgcolor="#ccffcc"
| 47
| February 3
| @ Atlanta Hawks
| W 112-110
| R. Pierce (26)
| S. Kemp (15)
| G. Payton (12)
| Omni Coliseum9,951
| 23-24

|- align="center" bgcolor="#ccffcc"
| 48
| February 5
| @ New Jersey Nets
| W 95-85
| R. Pierce (19)
| B. Benjamin (10)
| N. McMillan (4)
| Brendan Byrne Arena9,328
| 24-24

|- align="center" bgcolor="#ccffcc"
| 49
| February 11
| Houston Rockets
| W 105-99
| R. Pierce (31)
| S. Kemp (10)
| E. Johnson,N. McMillan,G. Payton (4)
| Seattle Center Coliseum12,676
| 25-24

|- align="center" bgcolor="#ccffcc"
| 50
| February 14
| San Antonio Spurs
| W 108-91
| R. Pierce (23)
| M. Cage (10)
| N. McMillan (8)
| Seattle Center Coliseum12,126
| 26-24

|- align="center" bgcolor="#ffcccc"
| 51
| February 15
| @ Golden State Warriors
| L 122-140
| E. Johnson (28)
| B. Benjamin (11)
| G. Payton (10)
| Oakland-Alameda County Arena15,025
| 26-25

|- align="center" bgcolor="#ccffcc"
| 52
| February 17
| Phoenix Suns
| W 98-96
| S. Kemp (24)
| S. Kemp (14)
| G. Payton (8)
| Seattle Center Coliseum11,144
| 27-25

|- align="center" bgcolor="#ccffcc"
| 53
| February 20
| Los Angeles Lakers
| W 105-103
| E. Johnson (24)
| M. Cage (14)
| G. Payton (7)
| Kingdome30,847
| 28-25

|- align="center" bgcolor="#ccffcc"
| 54
| February 22
| Portland Trail Blazers
| W 113-104
| E. Johnson (29)
| B. Benjamin (13)
| N. McMillan,G. Payton (8)
| Kingdome38,610
| 29-25

|- align="center" bgcolor="#ccffcc"
| 55
| February 24
| @ Minnesota Timberwolves
| W 106-91
| E. Johnson (26)
| S. Kemp (15)
| N. McMillan (8)
| Target Center18,082
| 30-25

|- align="center" bgcolor="#ccffcc"
| 56
| February 27
| @ Utah Jazz
| W 130-124 (OT)
| E. Johnson (32)
| S. Kemp (9)
| N. McMillan,G. Payton (7)
| Delta Center19,911
| 31-25

|- align="center" bgcolor="#ffcccc"
| 57
| February 29
| @ Sacramento Kings
| L 110-115
| E. Johnson (21)
| B. Benjamin (8)
| G. Payton (7)
| ARCO Arena17,014
| 31-26

|- align="center" bgcolor="#ccffcc"
| 58
| March 1
| Cleveland Cavaliers
| W 113-107
| E. Johnson,R. Pierce (22)
| B. Benjamin,M. Cage (14)
| R. Pierce (6)
| Seattle Center Coliseum13,647
| 32-26

|- align="center" bgcolor="#ccffcc"
| 59
| March 3
| Denver Nuggets
| W 111-92
| S. Kemp (21)
| S. Kemp (13)
| G. Payton (9)
| Seattle Center Coliseum9,865
| 33-26

|- align="center" bgcolor="#ffcccc"
| 60
| March 5
| @ Phoenix Suns
| L 105-118
| R. Pierce (23)
| S. Kemp (19)
| G. Payton (12)
| Arizona Veterans Memorial Coliseum14,496
| 33-27

|- align="center" bgcolor="#ccffcc"
| 61
| March 7
| New Jersey Nets
| W 109-98
| R. Pierce (27)
| M. Cage (13)
| N. McMillan (7)
| Seattle Center Coliseum13,419
| 34-27

|- align="center" bgcolor="#ffcccc"
| 62
| March 8
| @ Portland Trail Blazers
| L 97-109
| R. Pierce (28)
| R. Pierce (10)
| G. Payton (7)
| Memorial Coliseum12,888
| 34-28

|- align="center" bgcolor="#ffcccc"
| 63
| March 10
| Detroit Pistons
| L 92-98
| G. Payton (19)
| S. Kemp (9)
| N. McMillan (5)
| Seattle Center Coliseum13,098
| 34-29

|- align="center" bgcolor="#ccffcc"
| 64
| March 11
| @ Los Angeles Clippers
| W 104-96
| R. Pierce (19)
| B. Benjamin,M. Cage (6)
| G. Payton (9)
| Los Angeles Memorial Sports Arena10,912
| 35-29

|- align="center" bgcolor="#ccffcc"
| 65
| March 15
| Dallas Mavericks
| W 109-100
| R. Pierce (23)
| S. Kemp (15)
| G. Payton (8)
| Seattle Center Coliseum12,163
| 36-29

|- align="center" bgcolor="#ffcccc"
| 66
| March 17
| Golden State Warriors
| L 107-119
| R. Pierce (24)
| S. Kemp (15)
| R. Pierce (5)
| Seattle Center Coliseum13,163
| 36-30

|- align="center" bgcolor="#ccffcc"
| 67
| March 19
| @ Houston Rockets
| W 112-91
| R. Pierce (22)
| M. Cage,S. Kemp (14)
| G. Payton (11)
| The Summit15,122
| 37-30

|- align="center" bgcolor="#ffcccc"
| 68
| March 21
| @ San Antonio Spurs
| L 96-101
| E. Johnson (23)
| S. Kemp (13)
| D. Barros,M. Cage,N. McMillan (4)
| HemisFair Arena16,057
| 37-31

|- align="center" bgcolor="#ccffcc"
| 69
| March 22
| @ Dallas Mavericks
| W 113-105
| E. Johnson (31)
| S. Kemp (17)
| N. McMillan (8)
| Reunion Arena14,345
| 38-31

|- align="center" bgcolor="#ccffcc"
| 70
| March 24
| Houston Rockets
| W 128-106
| D. McKey (23)
| M. Cage,S. Kemp (11)
| N. McMillan,G. Payton (7)
| Seattle Center Coliseum11,377
| 39-31

|- align="center" bgcolor="#ccffcc"
| 71
| March 27
| Milwaukee Bucks
| W 96-95
| E. Johnson (21)
| N. McMillan (7)
| N. McMillan (6)
| Seattle Center Coliseum11,450
| 40-31

|- align="center" bgcolor="#ffcccc"
| 72
| March 28
| New York Knicks
| L 87-92
| S. Kemp (27)
| S. Kemp (12)
| N. McMillan (6)
| Seattle Center Coliseum14,812
| 40-32

|- align="center" bgcolor="#ccffcc"
| 73
| March 31
| Utah Jazz
| W 122-103
| D. Barros,E. Johnson (18)
| S. Kemp,G. Payton (10)
| G. Payton (13)
| Seattle Center Coliseum12,242
| 41-32

|- align="center" bgcolor="#ccffcc"
| 74
| April 2
| @ Sacramento Kings
| W 111-103
| E. Johnson (28)
| S. Kemp (11)
| R. Pierce (9)
| ARCO Arena17,014
| 42-32

|- align="center" bgcolor="#ccffcc"
| 75
| April 3
| @ Los Angeles Lakers
| W 96-91
| E. Johnson (24)
| S. Kemp (14)
| N. McMillan (11)
| Great Western Forum17,070
| 43-32

|- align="center" bgcolor="#ccffcc"
| 76
| April 7
| Los Angeles Lakers
| 117-88
| E. Johnson,G. Payton (18)
| S. Kemp (12)
| G. Payton (7)
| Seattle Center Coliseum12,335
| 44-32

|- align="center" bgcolor="#ccffcc"
| 77
| April 9
| Phoenix Suns
| 119-104
| S. Kemp (17)
| S. Kemp (14)
| N. McMillan (12)
| Seattle Center Coliseum11,223
| 45-32

|- align="center" bgcolor="#ffcccc"
| 78
| April 10
| @ Portland Trail Blazers
| L 103-113
| E. Johnson (36)
| S. Kemp (9)
| N. McMillan (12)
| Memorial Coliseum12,888
| 45-33

|- align="center" bgcolor="#ccffcc"
| 79
| April 12
| Minnesota Timberwolves
| W 126-116
| R. Pierce (21)
| S. Kemp (16)
| N. McMillan (10)
| Seattle Center Coliseum11,391
| 46-33

|- align="center" bgcolor="#ffcccc"
| 80
| April 14
| @ Phoenix Suns
| L 100-122
| S. Kemp (26)
| S. Kemp (11)
| G. Payton (6)
| Arizona Veterans Memorial Coliseum14,496
| 46-34

|- align="center" bgcolor="#ccffcc"
| 81
| April 17
| Sacramento Kings
| W 130-106
| S. Kemp (24)
| S. Kemp (14)
| N. McMillan (9)
| Seattle Center Coliseum12,129
| 47-34

|- align="center" bgcolor="#ffcccc"
| 82
| April 19
| @ Golden State Warriors
| L 106-108
| S. Kemp (23)
| S. Kemp (19)
| N. McMillan (9)
| Oakland–Alameda County Coliseum Arena15,025
| 47-35

Playoffs

|- align="center" bgcolor="#ccffcc"
| 1
| April 23
| @ Golden State
| W 117–109
| Kemp, Pierce (28)
| Shawn Kemp (16)
| Gary Payton (12)
| Oakland–Alameda County Coliseum Arena15,025
| 1–0
|- align="center" bgcolor="#ffcccc"
| 2
| April 25
| @ Golden State
| L 101–115
| Eddie Johnson (22)
| Shawn Kemp (19)
| Ricky Pierce (7)
| Oakland–Alameda County Coliseum Arena15,025
| 1–1
|- align="center" bgcolor="#ccffcc"
| 3
| April 28
| Golden State
| W 129–128
| Derrick McKey (27)
| Shawn Kemp (10)
| Nate McMillan (10)
| Seattle Center Coliseum14,252
| 2–1
|- align="center" bgcolor="#ccffcc"
| 4
| April 30
| Golden State
| W 119–116
| Ricky Pierce (27)
| Shawn Kemp (20)
| Nate McMillan (10)
| Seattle Center Coliseum14,252
| 3–1

|- align="center" bgcolor="#ffcccc"
| 1
| May 6
| @ Utah
| L 100–108
| Derrick McKey (20)
| Shawn Kemp (15)
| Nate McMillan (8)
| Delta Center19,911
| 0–1
|- align="center" bgcolor="#ffcccc"
| 2
| May 8
| @ Utah
| L 97–103
| Eddie Johnson (26)
| Shawn Kemp (9)
| Payton, Pierce (3)
| Delta Center19,911
| 0–2
|- align="center" bgcolor="#ccffcc"
| 3
| May 10
| Utah
| W 104–98
| Ricky Pierce (31)
| Benoit Benjamin (8)
| McMillan, Payton (6)
| Seattle Center Coliseum14,104
| 1–2
|- align="center" bgcolor="#ffcccc"
| 4
| May 12
| Utah
| L 83–89
| Ricky Pierce (21)
| Shawn Kemp (11)
| Nate McMillan (9)
| Seattle Center Coliseum14,252
| 1–3
|- align="center" bgcolor="#ffcccc"
| 5
| May 14
| @ Utah
| L 100–111
| Eddie Johnson (26)
| Michael Cage (11)
| Nate McMillan (12)
| Delta Center19,911
| 1–4

Player statistics

Season

* Statistics with the Seattle SuperSonics.

Playoffs

Awards and records

Records
 Michael Cage finished the season with a franchise record .566 in field goal percentage.

Transactions

Overview

Trades

Free agents

Additions

Waivings

Player Transactions Citation:

See also
 1991–92 NBA season

References

External links
 1991–92 Seattle SuperSonics season at Basketball Reference

Seattle SuperSonics seasons